James Warnock is an electrical engineer at the IBM Thomas J. Watson Research Corporation in Yorktown Heights, New York. He was named a Fellow of the Institute of Electrical and Electronics Engineers (IEEE) in 2012 for his contributions to the circuit design of high-performance microprocessors.

References

Fellow Members of the IEEE
Living people
Year of birth missing (living people)
Place of birth missing (living people)